A fetter is a type of leg restraint.

Fetter may also refer to:

 Fetter (Buddhism), Buddhist concept of mental fetter
 Fetter (surname)
 Fetter v. Beale, 1697 lawsuit about the crime of mayhem
 Fetter Lane, in London
 Fetter Schrier Hoblitzell (1838–1900), American politician
 Hughes v. Fetter, 1951 American lawsuit

See also
 Fetters (surname)
 Fort Fetter, Pennsylvania